Lecanora is a species of crustose lichen in the family Lecanoraceae. It was described as new to science in 1864 by American botanist Edward Tuckerman.

See also
List of Lecanora species

References

Lichen species
Lichens described in 1864
Lichens of North America
pinguis
Taxa named by Edward Tuckerman